The 1985–86 OB I bajnokság season was the 49th season of the OB I bajnokság, the top level of ice hockey in Hungary. Seven teams participated in the league, and Ujpesti Dozsa SC won the championship.

First round

Second round

Final round

4th-7th place

External links
 Season on hockeyarchives.info

Hun
OB I bajnoksag seasons
OB